The Boston Tea Party was an American political and mercantile protest by the Sons of Liberty in Boston, Massachusetts, on December 16, 1773. The target was the Tea Act of May 10, 1773, which allowed the British East India Company to sell tea from China in American colonies without paying taxes apart from those imposed by the Townshend Acts. The Sons of Liberty strongly opposed the taxes in the Townshend Act as a violation of their rights. Protesters, some disguised as Indigenous Americans, destroyed an entire shipment of tea sent by the East India Company.

The demonstrators boarded the ships and threw the chests of tea into the Boston Harbor. The British government considered the protest an act of treason and responded harshly. The episode escalated into the American Revolution, becoming an iconic event of American history. Since then other political protests such as the Tea Party movement have referred to themselves as historical successors to the Boston protest of 1773.

The Tea Party was the culmination of a resistance movement throughout British America against the Tea Act, a tax passed by the British Parliament in 1773. Colonists objected to the Tea Act believing it violated their rights as Englishmen to  "no taxation without representation", that is, to be taxed only by their own elected representatives and not by a parliament in which they were not represented. In addition, the well-connected East India Company had been granted competitive advantages over colonial tea importers, who resented the move and feared additional infringement on their business. Protesters had prevented the unloading of tea in three other colonies, but in Boston, embattled Royal Governor Thomas Hutchinson refused to allow the tea to be returned to Great Britain.

The Boston Tea Party was a significant event in the growth of the American Revolution. Parliament responded in 1774 with the Intolerable Acts, or Coercive Acts, which, among other provisions, ended local self-government in Massachusetts and closed Boston's commerce. Colonists up and down the Thirteen Colonies in turn responded to the Intolerable Acts with additional acts of protest, and by convening the First Continental Congress, which petitioned the British monarch for repeal of the acts and coordinated colonial resistance to them. The crisis escalated, and the American Revolutionary War began near Boston in 1775.

Background
The Boston Tea Party arose from two issues confronting the British Empire in 1765: the financial problems of the British East India Company; and an ongoing dispute about the extent of Parliament's authority, if any, over the British American colonies without seating any elected representation. The North Ministry's attempt to resolve these issues produced a showdown that would eventually result in revolution.

Tea trade to 1767
As Europeans developed a taste for tea in the 17th century, rival companies were formed to import the product from China. In England, Parliament gave the East India Company a monopoly on the importation of tea in 1698. When tea became popular in the British colonies, Parliament sought to eliminate foreign competition by passing an act in 1721 that required colonists to import their tea only from Great Britain. The East India Company did not export tea to the colonies; by law, the company was required to sell its tea wholesale at auctions in England. British firms bought this tea and exported it to the colonies, where they resold it to merchants in Boston, New York, Philadelphia, and Charleston.

Until 1767, the East India Company paid an ad valorem tax of about 25% on tea that it imported into Great Britain. Parliament laid additional taxes on tea sold for consumption in Britain. These high taxes, combined with the fact that tea imported into the Dutch Republic was not taxed by the Dutch government, meant that Britons and British Americans could buy smuggled Dutch tea at much cheaper prices. The biggest market for illicit tea was England—by the 1760s the East India Company was losing £400,000 per year to smugglers in Great Britain—but Dutch tea was also smuggled into British America in significant quantities.

In 1767, to help the East India Company compete with smuggled Dutch tea, Parliament passed the Indemnity Act, which lowered the tax on tea consumed in Great Britain and gave the East India Company a refund of the 25% duty on tea that was re-exported to the colonies. To help offset this loss of government revenue, Parliament also passed the Townshend Revenue Act of 1767, which levied new taxes, including one on tea, in the colonies. Instead of solving the smuggling problem, however, the Townshend duties renewed a controversy about Parliament's right to tax the colonies.

Townshend duty crisis

A controversy between Great Britain and the colonies arose in the 1760s when Parliament sought, for the first time, to impose a direct tax on the colonies for the purpose of raising revenue. Some colonists, known in the colonies as Whigs, objected to the new tax program, arguing that it was a violation of the British Constitution. Britons and British Americans agreed that, according to the constitution, British subjects could not be taxed without the consent of their elected representatives. In Great Britain, this meant that taxes could only be levied by Parliament. Colonists, however, did not elect members of Parliament, and so American Whigs argued that the colonies could not be taxed by that body. According to Whigs, colonists could only be taxed by their own colonial assemblies. Colonial protests resulted in the repeal of the Stamp Act in 1766, but in the 1766 Declaratory Act, Parliament continued to insist that it had the right to legislate for the colonies "in all cases whatsoever".

When new taxes were levied in the Townshend Revenue Act of 1767, Whig colonists again responded with protests and boycotts. Merchants organized a non-importation agreement, and many colonists pledged to abstain from drinking British tea, with activists in New England promoting alternatives, such as domestic Labrador tea. Smuggling continued apace, especially in New York and Philadelphia, where tea smuggling had always been more extensive than in Boston. Dutied British tea continued to be imported into Boston, however, especially by Richard Clarke and the sons of Massachusetts Governor Thomas Hutchinson, until pressure from Massachusetts Whigs compelled them to abide by the non-importation agreement.

Parliament finally responded to the protests by repealing the Townshend taxes in 1770, except for the tea duty, which Prime Minister Lord North kept to assert "the right of taxing the Americans". This partial repeal of the taxes was enough to bring an end to the non-importation movement by October 1770. From 1771 to 1773, British tea was once again imported into the colonies in significant amounts, with merchants paying the Townshend duty of three pence per pound in weight of tea. Boston was the largest colonial importer of legal tea; smugglers still dominated the market in New York and Philadelphia.

Tea Act of 1773

The Indemnity Act of 1767, which gave the East India Company a refund of the duty on tea that was re-exported to the colonies, expired in 1772. Parliament passed a new act in 1772 that reduced this refund, effectively leaving a 10% duty on tea imported into Britain. The act also restored the tea taxes within Britain that had been repealed in 1767, and left in place the three pence Townshend duty in the colonies, equal to £ today.  With this new tax burden driving up the price of British tea, sales plummeted. The company continued to import tea into Great Britain, however, amassing a huge surplus of product that no one would buy. For these and other reasons, by late 1772 the East India Company, one of Britain's most important commercial institutions, was in a serious financial crisis. The severe famine in Bengal from 1769 to 1773 had drastically reduced the revenue of the East India Company from India bringing the Company to the verge of bankruptcy and the Tea Act of 1773 was enacted to help the East India Company.

Eliminating some of the taxes was one obvious solution to the crisis. The East India Company initially sought to have the Townshend duty repealed, but the North ministry was unwilling because such an action might be interpreted as a retreat from Parliament's position that it had the right to tax the colonies. More importantly, the tax collected from the Townshend duty was used to pay the salaries of some colonial governors and judges. This was in fact the purpose of the Townshend tax: previously these officials had been paid by the colonial assemblies, but Parliament now paid their salaries to keep them dependent on the British government rather than allowing them to be accountable to the colonists.

Another possible solution for reducing the growing mound of tea in the East India Company warehouses was to sell it cheaply in Europe. This possibility was investigated, but it was determined that the tea would simply be smuggled back into Great Britain, where it would undersell the taxed product. The best market for the East India Company's surplus tea, so it seemed, was the American colonies, if a way could be found to make it cheaper than the smuggled Dutch tea.

The North ministry's solution was the Tea Act, which received the assent of King George on May 10, 1773. This act restored the East India Company's full refund on the duty for importing tea into Britain, and also permitted the company, for the first time, to export tea to the colonies on its own account. This would allow the company to reduce costs by eliminating the middlemen who bought the tea at wholesale auctions in London. Instead of selling to middlemen, the company now appointed colonial merchants to receive the tea on consignment; the consignees would in turn sell the tea for a commission. In July 1773, tea consignees were selected in New York, Philadelphia, Boston, and Charleston.  The Tea Act in 1773 authorized the shipment of 5,000 chests of tea (250 tons) to the American colonies. There would be a tax of £1,750 (equal to £ today) to be paid by the importers when the cargo landed. The act granted the EIC a monopoly on the sale of tea that was cheaper than smuggled tea; its hidden purpose was to force the colonists to pay a tax of 3 pennies on every pound of tea.

The Tea Act thus retained the three pence Townshend duty on tea imported to the colonies. Some members of Parliament wanted to eliminate this tax, arguing that there was no reason to provoke another colonial controversy. Former Chancellor of the Exchequer William Dowdeswell, for example, warned Lord North that the Americans would not accept the tea if the Townshend duty remained. But North did not want to give up the revenue from the Townshend tax, primarily because it was used to pay the salaries of colonial officials; maintaining the right of taxing the Americans was a secondary concern. According to historian Benjamin Labaree, "A stubborn Lord North had unwittingly hammered a nail in the coffin of the old British Empire."

Even with the Townshend duty in effect, the Tea Act would allow the East India Company to sell tea more cheaply than before, undercutting the prices offered by smugglers, but also undercutting colonial tea importers, who paid the tax and received no refund. In 1772, legally imported Bohea, the most common variety of tea, sold for about 3 shillings (3s) per pound, equal to £ today. After the Tea Act, colonial consignees would be able to sell it for 2 shillings per pound (2s), just under the smugglers' price of 2 shillings and 1 penny (2s 1d). Realizing that the payment of the Townshend duty was politically sensitive, the company hoped to conceal the tax by making arrangements to have it paid either in London once the tea was landed in the colonies, or have the consignees quietly pay the duties after the tea was sold. This effort to hide the tax from the colonists was unsuccessful.

Resisting the Tea Act

In September and October 1773, seven ships carrying East India Company tea were sent to the colonies: four were bound for Boston, and one each for New York, Philadelphia, and Charleston. In the ships were more than 2,000 chests containing nearly 600,000 pounds of tea. Americans learned the details of the Tea Act while the ships were en route, and opposition began to mount. Whigs, sometimes calling themselves Sons of Liberty, began a campaign to raise awareness and to convince or compel the consignees to resign, in the same way that stamp distributors had been forced to resign in the 1765 Stamp Act crisis.

The protest movement that culminated with the Boston Tea Party was not a dispute about high taxes. The price of legally imported tea was actually reduced by the Tea Act of 1773. Protesters were instead concerned with a variety of other issues. The familiar "no taxation without representation" argument, along with the question of the extent of Parliament's authority in the colonies, remained prominent. Samuel Adams considered the British tea monopoly to be "equal to a tax" and to raise the same representation issue whether or not a tax was applied to it. Some regarded the purpose of the tax program—to make leading officials independent of colonial influence—as a dangerous infringement of colonial rights. This was especially true in Massachusetts, the only colony where the Townshend program had been fully implemented.

Colonial merchants, some of them smugglers, played a significant role in the protests. Because the Tea Act made legally imported tea cheaper, it threatened to put smugglers of Dutch tea out of business. Legitimate tea importers who had not been named as consignees by the East India Company were also threatened with financial ruin by the Tea Act. Another major concern for merchants was that the Tea Act gave the East India Company a monopoly on the tea trade, and it was feared that this government-created monopoly might be extended in the future to include other goods.

In New York, Philadelphia, and Charleston, protesters compelled the tea consignees to resign. In Charleston, the consignees had been forced to resign by early December, and the unclaimed tea was seized by customs officials. There were mass protest meetings in Philadelphia. Benjamin Rush urged his fellow countrymen to oppose the landing of the tea, because the cargo contained "the seeds of slavery". By early December, the Philadelphia consignees had resigned, and in late December the tea ship returned to England with its cargo following a confrontation with the ship's captain. The tea ship bound for New York City was delayed by bad weather; by the time it arrived, the consignees had resigned, and the ship returned to England with the tea.

Standoff in Boston
In every colony except Massachusetts, protesters were able to force the tea consignees to resign or to return the tea to England. In Boston, however, Governor Hutchinson was determined to hold his ground. He convinced the tea consignees, two of whom were his sons, not to back down.

When the tea ship Dartmouth, arrived in the Boston Harbor in late November, Whig leader Samuel Adams called for a mass meeting to be held at Faneuil Hall on November 29, 1773. Thousands of people arrived, so many that the meeting was moved to the larger Old South Meeting House. British law required Dartmouth to unload and pay the duties within twenty days or customs officials could confiscate the cargo (i.e. unload it onto American soil). The mass meeting passed a resolution, introduced by Adams and based on a similar set of resolutions promulgated earlier in Philadelphia, urging the captain of Dartmouth to send the ship back without paying the import duty. Meanwhile, the meeting assigned twenty-five men to watch the ship and prevent the tea – including a number of chests from Davison, Newman and Co. of London – from being unloaded.

Governor Hutchinson refused to grant permission for Dartmouth to leave without paying the duty. Two more tea ships, Eleanor and Beaver, arrived in Boston Harbor. On December 16 – the last day of Dartmouth'''s deadline – approximately 5,000–7,000 people out of an estimated population of 16,000 had gathered around the Old South Meeting House.  After receiving a report that Governor Hutchinson had again refused to let the ships leave, Adams announced that "This meeting can do nothing further to save the country." According to a popular story, Adams's statement was a prearranged signal for the "tea party" to begin. However, this claim did not appear in print until nearly a century after the event, in a biography of Adams written by his great-grandson, who apparently misinterpreted the evidence. According to eyewitness accounts, people did not leave the meeting until 10–15 minutes after Adams's alleged "signal", and Adams in fact tried to stop people from leaving because the meeting was not yet over.

Destruction of the tea

While Samuel Adams tried to reassert control of the meeting, people poured out of the Old South Meeting House to prepare to take action. In some cases, this involved donning what may have been elaborately prepared Mohawk costumes. While disguising their individual faces was imperative, because of the illegality of their protest, dressing as Mohawk warriors was a specific and symbolic choice. It showed that the Sons of Liberty identified with America, over their official status as subjects of Great Britain.

That evening, a group of 30 to 130 men, some dressed in the Mohawk warrior disguises, boarded the three vessels and, over the course of three hours, dumped all 342 chests of tea into the water. The precise location of the Griffin's Wharf site of the Tea Party has been subject to prolonged uncertainty; a comprehensive study places it near the foot of Hutchinson Street (today's Pearl Street). The property damage amounted to the destruction of 92,000 pounds or 340 chests of tea, reported by the British East India Company worth £9,659, or $1,700,000 dollars in today's money.
The owner of two of the three ships was William Rotch, a Nantucket-born colonist and merchant.

Another tea ship intended for Boston, the William, had run aground at Cape Cod in December 1773, and its tea was taxed and sold to private parties. In March 1774, the Sons of Liberty received information that this tea was being held in a warehouse in Boston, entered the warehouse and destroyed all they could find. Some of it had already been sold to Davison, Newman and Co. and was being held in their shop. On March 7, Sons of Liberty once again dressed as Mohawks, broke into the shop, and dumped the last remaining tea into the harbor.Diary of John Adams, March 8, 1774; Boston Gazette, March 14, 1774

Reaction
Whether or not Samuel Adams helped plan the Boston Tea Party is disputed, but he immediately worked to publicize and defend it. He argued that the Tea Party was not the act of a lawless mob, but was instead a principled protest and the only remaining option the people had to defend their constitutional rights.

In Great Britain, even those politicians considered friends of the colonies were appalled and this act united all parties there against the colonies. The Prime Minister Lord North said, "Whatever may be the consequence, we must risk something; if we do not, all is over". The British government felt this action could not remain unpunished, and responded by closing the port of Boston and putting in place other laws known as the "Intolerable Acts."  Benjamin Franklin stated that the East India Company should be paid for the destroyed tea, all ninety thousand pounds (which, at two shillings per pound, came to £9,000, or £ [2014, approx. $1.7 million US]). Robert Murray, a New York merchant, went to Lord North with three other merchants and offered to pay for the losses, but the offer was turned down.

The incident resulted in a similar effect in North America, when news of the Boston Tea Party reached London in January and Parliament responded with a series of acts known collectively in the colonies as the Intolerable Acts. These were intended to punish Boston for the destruction of private property, restore British authority in Massachusetts, and otherwise reform colonial government in America.  Although the first three, the Boston Port Act, the Massachusetts Government Act and the Administration of Justice Act, applied only to Massachusetts, colonists outside that colony feared that their governments could now also be changed by legislative fiat in England. The Intolerable Acts were viewed as a violation of constitutional rights, natural rights, and colonial charters, and united many colonists throughout America, exemplified by the calling of the First Continental Congress in September 1774.

A number of colonists were inspired by the Boston Tea Party to carry out similar acts, such as the burning of Peggy Stewart. The Boston Tea Party eventually proved to be one of the many reactions that led to the American Revolutionary War. In his December 17, 1773, entry in his diary, John Adams wrote:

In February 1775, Britain passed the Conciliatory Resolution, which ended taxation for any colony that satisfactorily provided for the imperial defense and the upkeep of imperial officers. The tax on tea was repealed with the Taxation of Colonies Act 1778, part of another Parliamentary attempt at conciliation that failed.

Legacy

John Adams and many other Americans considered tea drinking to be unpatriotic following the Boston Tea Party.  Tea drinking declined during and after the Revolution, resulting in a shift to coffee as the preferred hot drink.

According to historian Alfred Young, the term "Boston Tea Party" did not appear in print until 1834. Before that time, the event was usually referred to as the "destruction of the tea". According to Young, American writers were for many years apparently reluctant to celebrate the destruction of property, and so the event was usually ignored in histories of the American Revolution. This began to change in the 1830s, however, especially with the publication of biographies of George Robert Twelves Hewes, one of the few still-living participants of the "tea party", as it then became known.

The Boston Tea Party has often been referenced in other political protests. When Mohandas Karamchand Gandhi led a mass burning of Indian registration cards in South Africa in 1908, a British newspaper compared the event to the Boston Tea Party. When Gandhi met with the Viceroy of India in 1930 after the Indian salt protest campaign, Gandhi took some duty-free salt from his shawl and said, with a smile, that the salt was "to remind us of the famous Boston Tea Party."

American activists from a variety of political viewpoints have invoked the Tea Party as a symbol of protest. In 1973, on the 200th anniversary of the Tea Party, a mass meeting at Faneuil Hall called for the impeachment of President Richard Nixon and protested oil companies in the ongoing oil crisis. Afterwards, protesters boarded a replica ship in Boston Harbor, hanged Nixon in effigy, and dumped several empty oil drums into the harbor. In 1998, two conservative US Congressmen put the federal tax code into a chest marked "tea" and dumped it into the harbor.

In 2006, a libertarian political party called the "Boston Tea Party" was founded. In 2007, the Ron Paul "Tea Party" money bomb, held on the 234th anniversary of the Boston Tea Party, broke the one-day fund-raising record by raising $6.04 million in 24 hours. Subsequently, these fund-raising "Tea parties" grew into the Tea Party movement, which dominated conservative American politics for the next two years, reaching its peak with a voter victory for the Republicans in 2010 who were widely elected to seats in the United States House of Representatives.

Boston Tea Party Ships and Museum

The Boston Tea Party Museum is located on the Congress Street Bridge in Boston. It features reenactments, a documentary, and a number of interactive exhibits.  The museum features two replica ships of the period, Eleanor and Beaver. Additionally, the museum possesses one of two known tea chests from the original event, part of its permanent collection.

Participants
Phineas Stearns
George Robert Twelves Hewes

Actual tea
The American Antiquarian Society holds in its collection a vial of actual tea-infused harbor water from 1773.

Cultural references
The Boston Tea Party has been subject of several films:
The Boston Tea Party, a 1908 film by Edwin S. Porter
The Boston Tea Party, a 1915 film by Eugene NowlandThe Boston Tea Party, a 1934 film narrated by John B. Kennedy
 Boston Tea Party, an educational Disney film excerpted from Johnny Tremain (1957)

It has been subject of The Boston Tea Party, a 1976 play by Allan Albert, and "Boston Tea Party", a 1976 song by the Sensational Alex Harvey Band from SAHB Stories.

See also
 Timeline of United States revolutionary history (1760–1789)
 Prelude to the American Revolution
 Pine Tree Riot, 1772
 Burning of the Peggy Stewart, 1774

Notes

References

General sources
 Alexander, John K. Samuel Adams: America's Revolutionary Politician. Lanham, Maryland: Rowman & Littlefield, 2002. .

 Carp, Benjamin L. Defiance of the Patriots: The Boston Tea Party and the Making of America (Yale U.P., 2010)  online

 Ketchum, Richard. Divided Loyalties: How the American Revolution came to New York. 2002. .
 Knollenberg, Bernhard. Growth of the American Revolution, 1766–1775. New York: Free Press, 1975. .
 Labaree, Benjamin Woods. The Boston Tea Party. Originally published 1964. Boston: Northeastern University Press, 1979. . online
 Maier, Pauline. The Old Revolutionaries: Political Lives in the Age of Samuel Adams. New York: Knopf, 1980. .
 Raphael, Ray. Founding Myths: Stories That Hide Our Patriotic Past. New York: The New Press, 2004. .
 Thomas, Peter D. G. The Townshend Duties Crisis: The Second Phase of the American Revolution, 1767–1773. Oxford: Oxford University Press, 1987. .
 Thomas, Peter D. G. Tea Party to Independence: The Third Phase of the American Revolution, 1773–1776. Oxford: Clarendon Press, 1991. .
 Young, Alfred F. The Shoemaker and the Tea Party: Memory and the American Revolution. Boston: Beacon Press, 1999. ; .

Further reading
 Norton, Mary Beth. 1774: The Long Year of Revolution (2020) online review by Gordon S. Wood
 Tyler, John W. Smugglers and Patriots: Boston Merchants and the Advent of the American Revolution (2019) online

External links

 The Boston Tea Party Historical Society
 Eyewitness Account of the Event
 Boston Tea Party Ships & Museum
 Tea Party Finds Inspiration In Boston History – audio report by NPR''
 Booknotes interview with Alfred Young on The Shoemaker and the Tea Party: Memory and the American Revolution, November 21, 1999
 BBC Radio program about the 'forgotten truth' behind the Boston Tea Party
 Eyewitness to History: The Boston Tea Party, 1773

Boston Harbor
1773 in the Thirteen Colonies
1773 protests
1773 riots
Massachusetts in the American Revolution
Political repression in the United States
History of the Thirteen Colonies
Rebellions in the United States
Tax resistance in the United States
History of Boston
Battles and conflicts without fatalities
History of tea
1773 in Massachusetts
British East India Company
1773 crimes in North America